Grace Brown (born 7 July 1992) is an Australian road racing cyclist, who currently rides for UCI Women's WorldTeam . Brown competed in the Tokyo 2020 Olympics. She just missed out on a medal in the women’s time trial, finishing fourth. She also competed in the women's road race where she came 47th.

Career

2015-2018 seasons

Brown started cycling in 2015 after previously being involved in running. She started 2018 riding for Holden Team Gusto Racing. She then joined British UCI team  for the latter part of 2018 season after being selected as the recipient of the Amy Gillett Cycling Scholarship.

2019-2020 seasons

Brown joined the  team at the start of the 2019 season. She had a good start to the 2019 season winning the Australian National Time Trial Championships and a stage at the Tour Down Under. She achieved her first major victory in Europe in the autumn of 2020 winning Brabantse Pijl in a solo breakaway. She was awarded AusCycling's Female Road Cyclist of the Year award for 2020.

2021 season

Brown started the 2021 season in Australia with second places in both the road race and time trial at the National Championships.

Brown had strong results in the 2021 Spring classics. She achieved her first victory in the Women's World Tour at Brugge-De Panne. She was also second at Nokere Koerse and third at the Tour of Flanders. She was selected in the Australian team to compete in the road race and time trial at the Tokyo Olympics. She finished fourth in the time trial.

In August 2021 Brown signed a two year contract with French Women's WorldTeam . She ended the 2021 season early to have shoulder surgery.

Major results

2018
 Oceania Continental Road Championships
1st  Time trial
2nd Road race
 National Road Championships
3rd Road race
4th Time trial
 5th Overall Women's Tour Down Under
2019
 1st  Time trial, National Road Championships
 1st Stage 3 Women's Tour Down Under
2020
 1st Brabantse Pijl
 2nd Liège–Bastogne–Liège
 National Road Championships
2nd Time trial
3rd Road race
 5th Time Trial, UCI Road World Championships
2021
 1st Classic Brugge–De Panne
 National Road Championships
2nd Road race
2nd Time trial
 2nd Nokere Koerse
 3rd Tour of Flanders
 4th Olympic Games Individual Time Trial
 5th La Course by Le Tour de France
 6th Dwars door Vlaanderen
 7th Overall Vuelta a Burgos Feminas
1st Stage 1
2022
 1st Time Trial Commonwealth Games
 1st La Périgord
 1st Stage 3 Ceratizit Challenge by La Vuelta
 National Road Championships
 1st  Time trial
 2nd Road race
 2nd Time Trial World Championships
 2nd Overall The Women's Tour
 1st Stage 4 
 Held  after Stage 4 & 5
 2nd Liège–Bastogne–Liège
 3rd Classic Lorient Agglomération - Trophée Ceratizit
 3rd GP de Plumelec-Morbihan
 4th La Classique Morbihan
 5th Overall Setmana Ciclista Valenciana
 7th Tour of Flanders
2023
 National Road Championships
 1st  Time trial
 2nd Road race
 1st Overall Tour Down Under
 1st Stage 3
 1st Points classification

References

External links

Australian female cyclists
Living people
1992 births
Cyclists from Victoria (Australia)
Olympic cyclists of Australia
Cyclists at the 2020 Summer Olympics
Commonwealth Games gold medallists for Australia
Commonwealth Games medallists in cycling
Cyclists at the 2022 Commonwealth Games
Medallists at the 2022 Commonwealth Games